Mickey Coll (12 February 1951, in San Juan, Puerto Rico – 23 December 1972, in Barceloneta, Puerto Rico) was a Puerto Rican basketball player who competed in the 1972 Summer Olympics.

Doping controversy 
Coll tested positive for amphetamine at the 1972 Olympics and was suspended for the rest of the Games.

References

1951 births
1972 deaths
Sportspeople from San Juan, Puerto Rico
Doping cases in basketball
Puerto Rican sportspeople in doping cases
Puerto Rican men's basketball players
Olympic basketball players of Puerto Rico
Basketball players at the 1972 Summer Olympics
Basketball players at the 1971 Pan American Games
Pan American Games medalists in basketball
Pan American Games silver medalists for Puerto Rico
Medalists at the 1971 Pan American Games